Hubert-Burda-Preis für junge Lyrik was a literary prize of Germany from 1999 to 2010, named after Hubert Burda.

Laureates
1999 Zoran Bognar, Maja Vidmar and Uroš Zupan
2000 Olga Martynova, Lewan Beridse and Natalia Belchenko
2001 Krzysztof Koehler, Mariusz Grzebalski, Marzanna Kielar and Jakub Ekier
2002 Petr Borkovec and Mirela Ivanova
2003 Constantin Virgil Bănescu, Kateřina Rudčenková and István Vörös
2004 Lubina Hajduk-Veljkovićowa, Maja Haderlap and Leo Tuor
2005 Julia Fiedorczuk, Ana Ristović and Igor Bulatovsky
2006 Serhiy Zhadan and Maria Stepanova
2007 Nikola Madzirov, Halyna Petrosanyak and Eugeniusz Tkaczyszyn-Dycki
2008 Valzhyna Mort, Delimir Rešicki and Tadeusz Dąbrowski
2009 Lidija Dimkovska, Iulian Tănase and Ostap Slyvynsky
2010 Lucija Stupica

German literary awards